The Secret of Association is the second studio album by the English singer Paul Young. Released in 1985, it reached number one on the UK album charts and the Top 20 in the US. The album spawned the hit singles "Everytime You Go Away", "I'm Gonna Tear Your Playhouse Down", "Everything Must Change" and "Tomb of Memories".

The album has been certified Double Platinum (600,000 copies sold) by the BPI in the UK and Gold (500,000 copies sold) in the US by the RIAA.

The album followed the pattern of Young's debut album, No Parlez, combining cover versions with original songs written by Young and keyboard player Ian Kewley. However, on this album the Young/Kewley partnership was better represented with five of their compositions featuring.

Track listing
All tracks composed by Paul Young and Ian Kewley; except where indicated.

 "Bite the Hand That Feeds" (Billy Livsey, Graham Lyle) - 4:31
 "Everytime You Go Away" (Daryl Hall) - 4:24
 "I'm Gonna Tear Your Playhouse Down" (Earl Randle) - 5:05
 "Standing on the Edge" (Andrew Barfield) - 4:38
 "Soldier's Things" (Tom Waits) - 6:21
 "Everything Must Change" - 5:35
 "Tomb of Memories" - 3:53
 "One Step Forward" - 3:42
 "Hot Fun" - 4:26
 "This Means Anything" - 3:13
 "I Was in Chains" (Gavin Sutherland) - 5:42
 "Man in the Iron Mask" (Billy Bragg) - 3:13 (Not included on vinyl record or U.S. releases.)
Note: some cassette releases  feature "Man In The Iron Mask" as track 6 and replace tracks 2, 3, 6, 9 and 11 with extended remix versions.

The Secret Of Association was re-released as a 2 x CD album in 2006 under licence on Edsel (EDSD2006) and contained a second CD containing 12" remixes and live tracks.  "The Man In The Iron Mask" was excluded from the first CD but was instead featured on the second CD.

CD2 Listing
 "I'm Gonna Tear Your Playhouse Down (special extended mix)"
 "Everything Must Change (12" mix)"
 "Give Me My Freedom"
 "Everytime You Go Away (12" mix)" 
 "Tomb Of Memories"
 "Man in the Iron Mask"
 "Bite the Hand That Feeds (live at Hammersmith Odeon)"
 "No Parlez (live at Hammersmith Odeon)"

Personnel 
 Paul Young – lead vocals, backing vocals, arrangements
 Ian Kewley – acoustic piano, Hammond organ, Yamaha DX7, Oberheim OB-Xa, Fairlight CMI, E-mu Emulator, arrangements
 Steve Bolton – guitars 
 John Turnbull – guitars, electric sitar (2)
 B. J. Cole – pedal steel guitar
 Matt Irving – keyboard bass
 Pino Palladino – bass guitar, Chapman stick
 Mark Pinder – drums, Simmons drums, LinnDrum, Roland TR-808, percussion
 Marc Chantereau – percussion
 Laurie Latham – effects, arrangements
 Nick Payn – saxophone (7)
 Paul Nieman – trombone (5)
 Jim Paterson – trombone (9)
 Mark Feltham – bass harmonica (11)
  – violin (11)
 Jimmy Chambers – backing vocals 
 George Chandler – backing vocals 
 Ged Doherty – backing vocals 
 Tony Jackson – backing vocals 
 Kim Lesley – backing vocals 
 Maz Roberts – backing vocals 
 Chris Difford – backing vocals (7)
 Glenn Tilbrook – backing vocals (7)

Production 
 Producer and Engineer – Laurie Latham
 Additional Engineers – Stewart Barry and James Illes
 Mastered by Tim Young
 Art Direction and Design – Rob O'Conner
 Cover Photography – Simon Fowler
 Inner Sleeve Photos – "Everyone"

Charts

Weekly charts

Year-end charts

Certifications

External links
The Secret of Association at Discogs

References

1985 albums
Paul Young albums
Albums produced by Laurie Latham
Columbia Records albums